Wally Ursuliak (born c. 1929) is a Canadian curler from Morinville, Alberta.

Overviews 

He was the lead on the Alberta Avenue CC curling team (from Edmonton, Alberta, Canada) during the World Curling Championships known as the 1961 Scotch Cup. He was inducted into the Canadian Curling Hall of Fame in 2006.

During the 1960s and 1970s, he along with Ray Turnbull and Don Duguid operated a series of curling clinics in Europe to try to popularize the game. In 1980s, he is also credited to introducing the game to the Japanese island of Hokkaido.

References

External links

Wally Ursuliak – Curling Canada Stats Archive

 
 Video:
 
 
 

Curlers from Edmonton
Brier champions
World curling champions
People from Sturgeon County
Canadian male curlers
Living people
1920s births